HD 28254 b (also known as HIP 20606 b) is an extrasolar planet which orbits the G-type main sequence star HD 28254, located approximately 178 light years away in the constellation Dorado.

Discovery 
The planet was discovered in a survey by HARPS along with 29 other planets in 2009.

Properties 
Due to the planets high mass, it's assumed to be a gas giant like Jupiter. Since HD 28254 was detected indirectly, properties such as its inclination, radius, and temperature are unknown. HD 28254 takes about 3 years to orbit its host. However, the planet has one of the most eccentric orbits around a star.

References 

Exoplanets discovered in 2009
Exoplanets detected by radial velocity
Giant planets
Dorado (constellation)